Indiana University Health University Hospital is a teaching hospital in Indianapolis, Indiana, United States, affiliated with the Indiana University School of Medicine and Indiana University Health.

With nearly 1,100 physician faculty members at Indiana University Health University Hospital, physicians, surgeons, nurses and staff care for more than 57,000 patients a year. Approximately 52 percent of physicians in Indiana were trained at Indiana University Health University Hospital. In addition, Indiana University Health University Hospital physicians and staff continuously seek advances in medicine. The staff actively participate in approximately 150 clinical and prevention trials to provide optimal patient treatments. 

As part of Indiana University Health, the hospital works closely with nearby Indiana University Health Methodist Hospital and Riley Hospital for Children at Indiana University Health.

The Indiana University Health University Hospital Emergency Department closed on June 30, 2014, with its adult emergency room care services moving to the Indiana University Health Methodist Hospital Emergency Medicine and Trauma Center.

See also
List of hospitals in Indianapolis

References

External links

Indiana University–Purdue University Indianapolis
Hospitals in Indiana
Indiana University
Teaching hospitals in Indiana
Healthcare in Indianapolis